Olga Borisovna Sokolovskaya (born 26 July 1991) is a Ukrainian-born Russian basketball defender. She was part of the Russian team that won the silver medal at the 2011 European Junior Championships. As a senior, she competed with WBC Dynamo Novosibirsk in the EuroCup in 2011–2014.

Her elder sister Irina is an Olympic basketball player, and her father Boris is a national basketball coach.

References 

Living people
Russian women's basketball players
1991 births